Jasikan is a small town and is the capital of Jasikan district, a district in the Oti Region of Ghana. It is home to Bueman Secondary School and Jasikan College of Education. It is the local business hub for Buem enclave and the seat of government for the district. The main language in the area is Leleme, and cocoa is the cash crop.

Geography

Location
Jasikan lies 260 kilometres north-east of Accra, the capital of Ghana.

See also
Jasikan District
Buem (Ghana parliament constituency)

References

External links and sources
Ghanaian Cities Towns and Villages www.ghanaquest.com 
Jasikan District on GhanaDistricts.com
 Google maps

Populated places in the Oti Region